3687 Dzus, provisional designation , is a carbonaceous asteroid from the central region of the asteroid belt, approximately 31 kilometers in diameter. It was discovered by German astronomer August Kopff at Heidelberg-Königstuhl State Observatory on 7 October 1908.

Orbit and classification 

Dzus orbits the Sun in the central main-belt at a distance of 2.2–3.3 AU once every 4 years and 6 months (1,645 days). Its orbit has an eccentricity of 0.20 and an inclination of 16° with respect to the ecliptic. As no precoveries were taken, the asteroid's observation arc begins with its discovery observation in 1908.

Physical characteristics 

The C-type asteroid is characterized as a Ch subtype in the SMASS classification.

Diameter and albedo 

According to the surveys carried out by the Infrared Astronomical Satellite IRAS, the Japanese Akari satellite, and NASA's Wide-field Infrared Survey Explorer with its subsequent NEOWISE mission, Dzus measures between 28.6 and 34.5 kilometers in diameter and its surface has an albedo between 0.038 and 0.054. The Collaborative Asteroid Lightcurve Link agrees with the results obtained by IRAS; that is an albedo of 0.038 and a diameter of 28.6 kilometers, based on an absolute magnitude of 11.5.

Rotation period 

A fragmentary lightcurve of Dzus was obtained from photometric observations made by Robert Stephens at the Santana Observatory in Rancho Cucamonga, California, during April to June 2002.

Naming 

This minor planet was named by Brian Geoffrey Marsden, long-time director of the Minor Planet Center (MPC), in honor of Paul K. Dzus (b. 1969) in appreciation of his helpful assistance since October 1987, much of the time as a volunteer. The official naming citation was published by the MPC on 23 December 1988.

References

External links 
 Asteroid Lightcurve Database (LCDB), query form (info )
 Dictionary of Minor Planet Names, Google books
 Asteroids and comets rotation curves, CdR – Observatoire de Genève, Raoul Behrend
 Discovery Circumstances: Numbered Minor Planets (1)-(5000) – Minor Planet Center
 
 

003687
Discoveries by August Kopff
Named minor planets
003687
19081007